Per Ivar Rydgren (or Per-Ivar) was the second on the Norrköpings CK curling team (from Sweden) during the World Curling Championships known as the 1962 Scotch Cup.

Rydgren and his team won his lone Swedish Men's Curling Championship in 1962, and represented Sweden at the 1962 Scotch Cup World Championships. There, they lost all their games. One factor that was to their disfavour was the fact that the Swedes were used to a rule where they had to release the rock before the tee-line, which was not the rule in international play.

References

External links
 
  (look at "CIP-20")
 Video:
 
 

1927 births
Swedish male curlers
Swedish curling champions